The study of Engineering Economics in Civil Engineering, also known generally as engineering economics, or alternatively engineering economy, is a subset of economics, more specifically, microeconomics. It is defined as a "guide for the economic selection among technically feasible alternatives for the purpose of a rational allocation of scarce resources." 
Its goal is to guide entities, private or public, that are confronted with the fundamental problem of economics.

This fundamental problem of economics consists of two fundamental questions that must be answered, namely what objectives should be investigated or explored and how should these be achieved?  Economics as a social science answers those questions and is defined as the knowledge used for selecting among “…technically feasible alternatives for the purpose of a rational allocation of scarce resources.”  Correspondingly, all problems involving "...profit-maximizing or cost-minimizing are engineering problems with economic objectives
and are properly described by the label "engineering economy".

As a subdiscipline practiced by civil engineers, engineering economics narrows the definition of the fundamental economic problem and related questions to that of problems related to the investment of capital, public or private in a broad array of infrastructure projects. Civil engineers confront more specialized forms of the fundamental problem in the form of inadequate economic evaluation of engineering projects.

Civil engineers under constant pressure to deliver infrastructure effectively and efficiently confront complex problems associated with allocating scarce resources for ensuring quality, mitigating risk and controlling project delivery. Civil engineers must be educated to recognize the role played by engineering economics as part of the evaluations occurring at each phase in the project lifecycle.

Thus, the application of engineering economics in the practice of civil engineering focuses on the decision-making process, its context, and environment in project execution and delivery. 
It is pragmatic by nature, integrating microeconomic theory with civil engineering practice  but, it is also a simplified application of economic theory in that it avoids a number of microeconomic concepts such as price determination, competition and supply and demand. 
  
This poses new, underlying economic problems of resource allocation for civil engineers in delivering infrastructure projects and specifically, resources for project management, planning and control functions. 

Civil engineers address these fundamental economic problems using specialized engineering economics knowledge as a framework for continuously “… probing economic feasibility…using a stage-wise approach…” throughout the project lifecycle. The application of this specialized civil engineering knowledge can be in the form of engineering analyses of life-cycle cost, cost accounting, cost of capital and the economic feasibility of engineering solutions for design, construction and project management. The civil engineer must have the ability to use engineering economy methodologies for the “formulation of objectives, specification of alternatives, prediction of outcomes” and estimation of minimum acceptability for investment and optimization. 

They must also be capable of integrating these economic considerations into appropriate engineering solutions and management plans that predictably and reliably meet project stakeholder expectations in a sustainable manner.

The civil engineering profession provides a special function in our society and economy where investing substantial sums of funding in public infrastructure requires "...some assurance that it will perform its intended function." 

Thus, the civil engineer exercising their professional judgment in making decisions about fundamental problems relies upon the profession's knowledge of engineering economics to provide "the practical certainty" that makes the social investment in public infrastructure feasible.

Course of Instruction
Historically, coursework and curricula in engineering economics for civil engineers has focused on capital budgeting: "...when to replace capital equipment, and which of several alternative investments to make.

Journals 
The Engineering Economist - published jointly by the Engineering Economy Division of the American Society of Engineering Education (ASEE) and the Institute of Industrial and Systems Engineers (IISE). It publishes "...original research, current practice, and teaching involving problems of capital investment."

See also 
American Society of Civil Engineers
Cost–benefit analysis
Social discount rate

Further reading
On materials specific to civil engineering:
 Wellington, A. M. (1877).The Economic Theory of the Location of Railways. Accessed at  
 Gotshall, William C. (1903) Notes on electric railway economics and preliminary engineering. McGraw Publishing Company. Accessed at 
 Hayford, John F. (1917) The relation of engineering to economics. Journal of Political Economy 25.1 : 59–63. Accessed at 
 Waddell, J. A. L. (1917). Engineering economics. Lawrence: University of Kansas. Accessed at 
 Waddell, J. A. L.  (1921) Economics of Bridgework: A Sequel to Bridge Engineering. J. Wiley & Sons, Incorporated. Accessed at 
 Fish, J. C. L. (1923). Engineering economics: First-principles. New York: McGraw-Hill. Accessed at 
 Grant, Eugene L. (1930) Principles of Engineering Economy, Accessed at  
 Burnham, T. H., & Hoskins, G. O. (1958). Engineering economics, by T.H. Burnham and G.O. Hoskins. London, Pitman.
 Barish, Norman N, (1962) Economic analysis for engineering and managerial decision making, Accessed at 
 Anon., (1963) Engineering economy, Engineering Dept, American Telephone and Telegraph Company.
 Sepulveda, Jose A. and Souder, William E. (1984) Schaum's Outline of Engineering Economics. McGraw-Hill Companies. Accessed at 
 Newnan, Donald G., et al. (1998) Engineering economic analysis. 7th ed. Accessed at  

For more generalized discussion:
 Jaffe, William J.  L. P. Alford and the Evolution of Modern Industrial Management.  New York: 1957
 Nelson, Daniel.  Frederick W. Taylor and the Rise of Scientific Management.  Madison: University of Wisconsin Press, 1980.
 Noble, David F.  America by Design: Science, Technology, and the Rise of Corporate Capitalism.  New York: Alfred A. Knopf, 1977.

External links
 Benefit-Cost Analysis Center at the University of Washington's Daniel J. Evans School of Public Affairs
 Benefit-Cost Analysis site maintained by the Transportation Economics Committee of the Transportation Research Board(TRB).

References

Business economics
Business planning
Budgets
Capital budgeting
Cost engineering
Civil engineering
Engineering economics
Economic theories
Investment
Costs
Management accounting
Decision analysis
Evaluation methods
Project management techniques
Public finance